Ernesto Grassi (2 May 1902 – 22 December 1991) was an Italian philosopher.

Life

He maintained an intimate friendship with Donald Phillip Verene.

Thought
Grassi sought to take up the Heideggerean Destruktion of metaphysics, grounding his philosophical enterprise instead in the tradition of rhetoric. He identified the Italian humanist tradition as a potential site to begin this development of philosophy, and his works often contain copious references to the Italian humanists. In this tradition, "work and metaphor are the source of human history and society", an approach to thought which must reject the rational, proceeding as it does from "general and necessary premises."

His work Rhetoric as Philosophy is considered as "the first protracted attempt to synthesize Italian humanism with rhetoric, as a source of philosophical invention."

Grassi's theory on Rhetoric and Humanism 

Looking at the theory of Ernesto Grassi of rhetoric and humanism, he inherited ideas from the likes of Plato, Aristotle, Cicero and Quintilian to help introduce and assure his theory. Grassi was quite specific when it came to understanding his ideas. He starts with making sure that the "description of nature of rhetoric is to summarize the distinction he draws between critical or rational discourse and topical discourse," (Golden. Berquist, Coleman, & Sprouse. 2011, 307). When it comes to his theory he normally would side with Giambattista Vico (an Italian philosopher, 1668-1744).

There are three primary faculties of true rhetoric:

Ingenium-Most important and essential to the understanding of humanistic tradition. Those who have an issue within this "trait" have issues with traditional humanistic advances within their lives.

Work- This "trait", according to Grassi, helps develop the understanding of need and development of the history of mankind. It allows us to create our imprints of today for the history of tomorrow.

Metaphor-With this, according to Grassi, a person must be able to bring together Ingenium and work making metaphor beneficial for the continuation of growth and development.

Ingenium, Work, and Metaphor is intertwined with knowledge, rationality, language and plays a role in nature.

References

External links 

1902 births
1991 deaths
20th-century Italian philosophers